The men's 400 metre individual medley competition at the 2010 Pan Pacific Swimming Championships took place on August 19 at the William Woollett Jr. Aquatics Center.  The last champion was Michael Phelps of US.

This race consisted of eight lengths of the pool. The first two lengths were swum using the butterfly stroke, the second pair with the backstroke, the third pair of lengths in breaststroke, and the final two were freestyle.

Records
Prior to this competition, the existing world and Pan Pacific records were as follows:

Results
All times are in minutes and seconds.

Heats
The first round was held on August 19, at 11:14.
As only two members of each nation can enter Final A, Michael Phelps, despite finishing with the fourth fastest time, was the third fastest American, therefore could not compete in Final A. He did not participate in Final B either.

B Final 
The B final was held on August 19, at 19:18.

A Final 
The A final was held on August 19, at 19:18.

References

2010 Pan Pacific Swimming Championships